The EEL ULF-2 is a German low-wing, conventional landing gear, single-seat motor glider that was designed by Dieter Reich and is provided in the form of plans by Entwicklung und Erprobung von Leichtflugzeugen for amateur construction.

Design and development
The prototype was built in 1993 by Anton Quanz with Horst Fischer building the engine installation and electrical system. The ULF-2 first flew in October 1993.

The ULF-2 is predominantly constructed from northern pine or Douglas fir, with spruce and birch plywood and covered with doped aircraft fabric. The engine cowling, wing tips and fairings are made from fibreglass. The  span wing features a Wortmann FX 63-137 airfoil and top surface spoilers. The aircraft mounts a ballistic parachute full-aircraft recovery system. The landing gear is conventional with a steerable tailwheel.

The recommended engine is from a Citroën Visa automobile, which consumes 4.0 L/hr (1.06 US gallon per hour) and produces . The propeller is powered via a belt reduction drive. The muffler system allows the aircraft to comply with the ICAO Annex 16, Chapt. 10 noise requirements of 55 dB(A).

The aircraft's wings fold on gimbal joints for storage or ground transportation in a trailer.

The ULF-2 received its Certificate of Airworthiness in February 1995. As a result of his design work Reich received the OUV Hans-Becker-Prize in June 1997. The plans consists of 29 sheets of blueprints, a 50-page construction manual and a 20-page flight manual, available in both English and German. The plans cost  €350 and a completed aircraft is estimated to cost €8000.

The aircraft has very benign stall characteristics, resulting in a controllable slow speed mush condition.

Operational history
The first ULF-2 completed by a customer was flown in 1999 and a total 15 have been finished and flown.

Specifications (ULF-2)

See also

References

External links

1990s German sailplanes
Homebuilt aircraft
Entwicklung und Erprobung von Leichtflugzeugen aircraft
Motor gliders
Aircraft first flown in 1993